The Learning Company (TLC) was an educational software company founded in 1980 in Palo Alto, California and headquartered in Fremont, California. The company produced a grade-based line of learning software, edutainment games, and productivity tools. Its titles included the flagship series Reader Rabbit, for preschoolers through second graders, and The ClueFinders, for more advanced students. The company was also known for publishing licensed educational titles featuring characters such as Arthur, Scooby-Doo, Zoboomafoo, and Caillou.

In 1995, the company was acquired by SoftKey in a hostile takeover bid, at which point SoftKey assumed the Learning Company name and brand.

History 
The Learning Company was founded in 1980 by Ann McCormick; Leslie Grimm; Teri Perl; and Warren Robinett, a former Atari employee who had programmed the popular game Adventure. They saw the Apple II as an opportunity to teach young children concepts of math, reading, science, problem-solving, and thinking skills. Part of the original funding for the company came from a National Science Foundation grant.

TLC produced launch titles for the PCjr, announced in late 1983. From 1980 through 1984, it created a line of 15 widely acclaimed children's educational software products, which were sold through the U.S. retail and school computer software channels.

In the first half of 1985, the board hired as CEO Bill Dinsmore. Shortly thereafter, Reece Duca, a founding Partner of the Investment Group of Santa Barbara (IGSB), became a member of the board of directors and purchased shares from several founders and original venture firms. In late 1986, Duca was elected chairman of the board. At that time, IGSB became The Learning Company's largest shareholder.

Between 1985 and 1995, TLC's revenues grew at a 36% compounded rate from $2.4M to $53.2M and profitability increased from breakeven in 1985 to a 20% pre-tax margin. The leading families of products were the Reader Rabbit series for ages 2–8, the Treasure Mountain Reading-Math-Science series for ages 5–9, the Super Solver series for ages 7–12, the Student Writing & Publishing Center for ages 7-adult, and the Foreign Language Learning series for ages 15-adult.

TLC went public on April 28, 1992, in an IPO led by Morgan Stanley and Robertson, Stephens & Co. From 1992 to 1995, TLC achieved 16 consecutive quarters of revenues and profits growth, never experiencing a down quarter or year. TLC's early struggles, followed by 10 consecutive years of outstanding performance, were the subject of case studies at both Harvard and Stanford universities.

SoftKey acquisition 

On December 8, 1995, TLC was acquired by SoftKey for $606M in a hostile takeover bid, and a large percentage of the staff were fired. After the acquisition was complete, SoftKey changed its name to The Learning Company and continued to use its brand.

Software 

Note: When The Learning Company purchased Broderbund Software and MECC, they gained the rights to the long-running Carmen Sandiego and Trail series, respectively. Only those games created during the ownership of The Learning Company are included here.

Carmen Sandiego series 

Carmen Sandiego's ThinkQuick Challenge (1999)
Where in the World is Carmen Sandiego? Treasures of Knowledge (2001)
Carmen Sandiego Adventures in Math (2011–2012)
Carmen Sandiego Returns (2015)

The ClueFinders series 

Grade-based titles
The ClueFinders 3rd Grade Adventures (1998)
The ClueFinders 4th Grade Adventures (1998)
The ClueFinders 5th Grade Adventures (1999)
The ClueFinders 6th Grade Adventures (1999)
Other titles
The ClueFinders Math Adventures (1998)
The ClueFinders Reading Adventures (1999)
The ClueFinders Search and Solve Adventures (2000)
The ClueFinders: The Incredible Toy Store Adventure! (2001)
The ClueFinders: Mystery Mansion Arcade (2002)

Fisher-Price series 

Created and published by Davidson & Associates / Knowledge Adventure and re-released by The Learning Company.
Fisher-Price: Dream Dollhouse (1995)
Fisher-Price: Great Adventures: Castle (1995)
Fisher-Price: Great Adventures: Pirate Ship (1996)
Fisher-Price: Great Adventures: Wild Western Town (1997)
Fisher-Price: Big Action Garage (1998)
Fisher-Price: Big Action Construction (1998)
Fisher-Price: Little People Christmas Activity Center (1999)
Fisher-Price: Time to Play Dollhouse (1999)
Fisher-Price: Time to Play Pet Shop (1998)
Fisher-Price: Outdoor Adventures: Ranger Trail (1999)
Fisher-Price: Rescue Heroes: Hurricane Havoc (1999)
Fisher-Price: Toddler (1999)
Fisher-Price: Preschool (1999)
Fisher-Price: Kindergarten (1999)

Reader Rabbit series 

Age-based titles
Reader Rabbit Playtime for Baby
Reader Rabbit Toddler
Grade-based titles
Reader Rabbit Preschool
Reader Rabbit Preschool: Sparkle Star Rescue
Reader Rabbit Kindergarten
Reader Rabbit 1st Grade
Reader Rabbit 2nd Grade (later titled Reader Rabbit 2nd Grade: Classic)
Reader Rabbit 2nd Grade: Mis-cheese-ious Dreamship Adventures
Other titles
Reader Rabbit 1 (1984)
Math Rabbit (1986; later titled Reader Rabbit Math)
Writer Rabbit (1986)
Reader Rabbit 2 (1991)
Reader Rabbit 3 (1993)
Reader Rabbit's Interactive Reading Journey (1994)
Reader Rabbit Thinking Games

StarFlyers series 

Royal Jewel Rescue (2002)
Alien Space Chase (2002)

Super Seekers games 
Treasure Mountain! (1990)
Note: This game was originally released as a regular Super Solvers title.
Treasure MathStorm! (1992)
Treasure Cove! (1992)
Treasure Galaxy! (1994)

Super Solvers series 
Midnight Rescue! (later re-released as Super Solvers Reading and then Leap Ahead! 3rd Grade) (1989)
OutNumbered! (later re-released as Leap Ahead! 3rd Grade) (1990)
Challenge of the Ancient Empires! (Ancient Empires) (1990)
Spellbound! (later re-released as Leap Ahead! Spelling) (1991)
Gizmos & Gadgets! (1993)
Mission: T.H.I.N.K. (1997)

Trail series 

Africa Trail (1995)
The Oregon Trail 3rd Edition (1997)
Amazon Trail 3rd Edition (1998)
The Oregon Trail 4th Edition (1999)
The Oregon Trail 5th Edition (2001)

Zoombinis series 

Zoombinis Logical Journey (1996; remade 2015)
Zoombinis Mountain Rescue (2001)
Zoombinis Island Odyssey (2002)

Other games 
Explore Yellowstone (1997)
 The Powerpuff Girls: Mojo Jojo's Clone Zone (2002)
 The Powerpuff Girls: Princess Snorebucks (2003)
Prince of Persia 3D (1999)
Soul Fighter (1999)
SpongeBob SquarePants Typing (2004)
Vlad Tepes Dracula (1997)
Real World series
Operation Neptune (1991)
Note: This game was eventually added to the Super Solvers series.
Time Riders in American History
Math For The Real World
PokéROM
Adventure/puzzle games
Rocky's Boots (1982)
Gertrude's Secrets (1984)
Gertrude's Puzzles (1984)
Robot Odyssey (1984)
Think Quick! (1987)
Logic Quest 3D (1996)
Road Adventures USA
Achieve! games
Achieve! Math & Science: Grades 1–3
Achieve! Phonics, Reading & Writing: Grades 1–3
Achieve! Math & Science: Grades 3–6
Achieve! Writing & Language Arts Grades 3–6
PBS Kids tie-in games
Caillou's Magic Playhouse
Caillou's Four Seasons of Fun
Caillou's Party Fun and Games
Zoboomafoo Animal Alphabet
Zoboomafoo Creature Quest
Arthur: Ready to Race
Jay Jay the Jet Plane: Jay Jay Earns his Wings
Jay Jay the Jet Plane: Sky Heroes to the Rescue
Cyberchase: Carnival Chaos
Cyberchase: Castleblanca Quest
Liberty's Kids
Arthur's Absolutely Fun Day! (2000)
Tools and other programs
All-Star Typing
The American Girls Premiere
Read, Write, and Type
MetroGnomes' Music
The Children's Writing & Publishing Center
The Writing Center
Student Writing Center
Other early educational programs
Magic Spells
Bumble Games
Bumble Plot
Moptown Hotel
Moptown Parade
Wordspinner
Juggles' Butterfly
Juggles' Rainbow
Juggles' House
Ultimate Children's Encyclopedia

References

External links 
  (archived)
The Learning Company at MobyGames

Houghton Mifflin Harcourt
Companies based in San Francisco
Video game companies established in 1980
Video game companies disestablished in 1995
Software companies based in Iowa
Defunct educational software companies
Defunct video game companies of the United States
Video game development companies
Video game publishers
 
1999 mergers and acquisitions
2001 mergers and acquisitions
1980 establishments in California
Mattel